Kujawiak Włocławek was a Polish football and athletics club based in Włocławek, Poland.

Its claim to fame is that the famous Polish singer Maryla Rodowicz and international javelin thrower Zygmunt Jałoszyński used to actively train at the club. Marcin Klatt and Rezső Patkoló has played for the football team.

They shared a rivalry with neighbours Włocłavia Włocławek.

History
The club was founded in 1911 making it one of the oldest clubs in Poland. The club had a very successful period in the club's history in the 2000s, especially in the 2005-2006 season when after a period in the second flight of the football pyramid and a marvellous Cup run where they reached the quarter-final, beating two top-flight teams Cracovia and Pogoń Szczecin, before being eventually knocked out by another top-flight team Wisła Płock. This golden era came to end in autumn 2005 when Zawisza Bydgoszcz SA was created when Kujawiak were moved to Bydgoszcz and renamed by their owners Hydrobudowa. The original Zawisza Bydgoszcz continued playing in the fourth division, however the new club had a very similar logo and an identical name. As a result, Kujawiak, Zawisza and supporters all over the country boycotted the relocated team. The new Kujawiak/Zawisza club folded in 2007 as a result of serious corruption allegations and widespread condemnation. The reserve team continued to play under the name Kujawiak Włocławek in the Fourth Polish league but withdrew from all competitions at the end the season in 2008.

Major achievements
 Winners Third Division - 2003/2004
 Quarter-final Polish Cup - 2005/2006
 Cuiavian Polish Cup Winners - 2003/2004

See also
 Football in Poland

References

Football clubs in Kuyavian-Pomeranian Voivodeship
Włocławek
Association football clubs established in 1911
1911 establishments in Poland
Association football clubs disestablished in 2008
2008 disestablishments in Poland
Defunct football clubs in Poland
Multi-sport clubs
Athletics clubs in Poland